Aeromonas australiensis is a Gram-negative, anaerobic bacterium from the genus Aeromonas isolated from an irrigation water system in Western Australia.

References

External links
Type strain of Aeromonas australiensis at BacDive -  the Bacterial Diversity Metadatabase

Aeromonadales
Bacteria described in 2013